Ridi Corporation (Korean: 리디주식회사) is a content platform company established in March 2008.

Ridi Corporation started its e-book platform business, Ridibooks, in 2009, and has expanded its service into webcomic, web novel, and animation etc.

Aside from Ridibooks, Ridi Corporation also holds a global digital comics service called Manta. Manta is a subscription-based service that allows all members to read unlimited amounts of content on its app at a fixed price. The app is available for Android and iOS devices.

Ridi Corporation's financial performance has shown continuous growth since 2010 4Q to 2021 3Q for 44 consecutive quarters

History 
Ridi Corporation launched its first service, Ridibooks in November 2009. 
Korea's e-book market was in its early stage, where traditional publishers were reluctant and unfamiliar to the e-book form. 
Ridibooks was one of the first players to pioneer the Korean e-book market.

Since 2018, Ridi Corporation has been expanding its content spectrum, serving web novel, webcomics, and animation in different products. 
Currently, Ridi Corporation produces its original comics with its in-house studio and outside partners. Its original comics is based on existing stories in the form of webfiction, also known as 'novelcomics'. 
Also they focus on searching IPs through open webcomic competitions.

In November 2020, Ridi launched a subscription-based digital comics service, Manta, available for the global audience. 
Manta is one of the very few subscription-based comics services in the market, and focuses mainly on bringing original stories from RIDI. In its first year of launch, Manta had over 3 million downloads.

In April 2020, Ridi Corporation raised KRW 20 billion investment from Korea Development Bank (KDB 산업은행).

In March 2022, Ridi Corporation raised $99.4 million in a funding round led by GIC (Singaporean Sovereign Wealth Fund).

Timeline 
 2009.11 Launched Ridibooks
 2015.10 Launched e-book reader 'Ridi Paper' 1st generation
 2015.12 Launched e-book reader 'Ridi Paper' 2nd generation
 2018.06 Acquired book marketing service 'Dinoment' (Dog-ear channel)
 2018.06 Exported 'Ridi Paper' (Taiwan)
 2018.07 Launched premium content subscription service, 'Ridi Select'
 2018.12 Acquired IT news service 'Outstanding'
 2019.07 Selected as 'Pre Unicorn stage startup' by Ministry of SMEs and Startups's Korea Technology Finance Corporation
 2019.08 Merged with animation streaming service 'Laftel'
 2019.12. Launched e-book reader 'Ridi Paper' 3rd generation
 2020.01. Established IP content Hub 'OrangeD'
 2020.11. Launched global webcomic subscription service 'Manta'
 2020.12 Awarded '2020 Venture Startup promotion contribution' by Ministry of SMEs and Startup
 2021.01. Selected as Ministry of SMEs and Startup's 'Venture 100billion club'
 2021.04. Awarded for 'well managed COVID19 private company' from the Prime Minister
 2022.03. Raised $99.4 million in a funding round led by Singapore sovereign wealth fund GIC at a valuation of $1.3 billion, becoming the first content platform startup in the country to achieve unicorn status.
 2022.11. 'Laftel' was acquired jointly by PEF Keistone and Kosdaq-listed animation distributor, Aniplus
 2023.01. Began to offer Spanish language service on Manta

References

External links 
 Dog-ear(책 끝을 접다): Content curation channel
 Laftel: Animation streaming platform
 Manta: Global webcomic subscription service
 Ridi Paper: e-book reader
 Ridi Select: Korean monthly e-book subscription service
 Ridibooks: Korean digital content platform that serves webcomic, webfiction, comic, e-book etc.

2008 establishments in South Korea
Ebook suppliers